W. Brent Powell (born July 21, 1970) is a judge of the Supreme Court of Missouri.

Biography

Powell received his Bachelor of Arts from William Jewell College and his Juris Doctor from the University of Missouri School of Law in 1996. After graduation from law school he joined the law firm of Lathrop & Gage from 1996 to 1997.

Prior to his judicial service, Powell served as a federal prosecutor for the United States Attorney's Office in the Western District of Missouri for seven years. Powell also served as an assistant prosecuting attorney for the Platte County Prosecutor's Office.

Judicial career

State court 

He was a state trial judge for Division 11 of the Jackson County Circuit Court in Missouri. Powell was appointed by Missouri Governor Matt Blunt on February 15, 2008, and was retained in 2010 and 2016 until his appointment to the Supreme Court.

Missouri Supreme Court 

On March 1, 2017 Powell was named as one of three potential applicants to fill the vacant Supreme Court seat, the other two applicants being Judge Lisa White Hardwick and attorney  Benjamin A. Lipman.

On April 25, 2017 Governor Eric Greitens appointed Powell to the Supreme Court to fill the seat left by the death of Richard B. Teitelman.

He was officially sworn in and seated on the court on May 2, 2017.

References

External links
Official Biography on the Missouri Supreme Court website

1970 births
Living people
21st-century American judges
Assistant United States Attorneys
Missouri lawyers
Missouri state court judges
Judges of the Supreme Court of Missouri
People from Springfield, Missouri
University of Missouri School of Law alumni
William Jewell College alumni